Jarosław is a Polish given name, equivalent to Jaroslav. It is composed of the elements jar meaning 'strong' or 'powerful' and sława meaning 'glory' or 'fame'.

Diminutive forms include Jarek. Its feminine form is Jarosława .

Individuals with this name may choose their name day from the following dates: January 21, April 25, June 7, or August 1.

People and characters with the name Jarosław(a) 
Jarosław, Duke of Opole (aft. 1143 – 1201), was a Duke Opole from 1173 and Bishop of Wrocław from 1198 until his death
Jarosław z Bogorii i Skotnik (ca. 1276 – 1376), Polish nobleman and bishop, member of the Bogoriowie family of the Bogorya
Jarosław Dąbrowski, Polish general and Commander-in-Chief of the Paris Commune, Polish nobleman and military officer in the Imperial Russian Army, a left-wing independence activist and radical republican[2] for Poland
Jarosław Hampel (born 1982), Polish Speedway rider
Jarosław Iwaszkiewicz, (1894–1980), Polish writer, poet, essayist, dramatist and translator
Jarosława Jóźwiakowska (born 1937), Polish athlete who mainly competed in the high jump
Jarosław Kaczyński (born 1949), Polish politician, Prime Minister (2006-2007)
Jarosław Kukowski (born 1972), Polish contemporary painter, juror of international art competitions
Jarosław Kukulski (1944–2010) Polish composer. He was the husband of late singer Anna Jantar and the father of singer Natalia Kukulska
Jarosław Wałęsa (born 1976), Polish politician, son of former Polish President, Lech Wałęsa.

See also 
 Polish name
 Slavic names

Polish masculine given names